D3 is a 2023 Indian Tamil-language crime thriller written and film directed by Balaaji. The film stars Prajin,Vidya Pradeep, VMT Charle,  in the lead roles with Rahul Madhav, Abhishek Kumar, Varghese Mathew, Gayathiri Yuvaraj and  Aroul D Shankar portraying supporting roles. The film was released theatrically on 17 March 2023.

Cast

Production 
The film poster was released by Venkat Prabhu and Vijay Antony on June 25 2022..An early glimpse was released on 29 July 2022..During the audio launch Prajin actor noted that he acted naked in this film, as the director had asked.Sibi Sathyaraj and Vijay Sethupathi released the trailer. The film audio launch and trailer launch was look place on 5 November 2022.The release date was announced as 17 March 2023.

Reception 

Logesh Balachandran of Times of india gave 2.5 stars out of 5 stars and stated that " D3 engages us in parts but struggles to give that immersive experience one would expect from an investigative thriller.".Maalai Malar Critic wrote that "Prajin, who is playing the hero, has put in a lot of work for the film" and gave 2.75 rating out of 5 ratings. Manigandan Kr of thesouthfirst wrote that "Rahul Madhav, who plays a doctor and a close friend of Vikram, steals the limelight." Dinamalar critic gave mixture of review and gave 2.5 rating out of 5.Dina Thanthi  critic noted that "Climax vibrates'.

References

External links 

2023 films
2020s Tamil-language films
Indian thriller films